The Muni is an estuary of several rivers of Equatorial Guinea and Gabon. Part of its length form part of the border with Gabon. It is from this estuary that the former name for this part of Equatorial Guinea, Río Muni was taken.

Hydrology
The estuary is fed in the north by the Congue and the Mandyani River and from the east by the Mitong, the Mven and the Timboni River (Mitimele, Utamboni).

References

Bodies of water of Equatorial Guinea
Bodies of water of Gabon
International rivers of Africa
Equatorial Guinea–Gabon border
Ramsar sites in Equatorial Guinea